Marie-Louise Loubet (1843–1925) was the wife of the President of France Émile Loubet. 

She was reportedly not interested in participating in representation but did so anyway, hosting garden parties and accompanying her spouse to the theatre and opera. Her daughter performed many of her tasks. She was however reportedly somewhat interested in diplomacy and once referred to as the presidential adviser in foreign policy.

She received the Grand Cordon of the Order of Charity of the Ottoman Empire in early 1900.
When Marie Curie was invited to the Elysée palace this happened:

References

1843 births
1925 deaths
Spouses of French presidents
Spouses of prime ministers of France